Curtis Field  is a city-owned airport three miles northeast of Brady, in McCulloch County, Texas. The airport is named for Mayor Harry L. Curtis of Brady, who proposed the site as an auxiliary field for the United States Army Air Forces (USAAF). The FAA's National Plan of Integrated Airport Systems for 2009–2013 calls it a general aviation facility.

History
Construction of the airport began in November 1940. The Works Progress Administration provided labor for the project with the city and county providing equipment for leveling and grading. The airport opened in August 1941. On January 1, 1942, the facility was taken over by the United States Army Air Forces and was used during World War II as a primary (stage 1) pilot training airfield. Facilities at the 354-acre field included a headquarters building and annex, a ground school, an infirmary, mess hall, three barracks, and four hangars.

Known as Curtis Field, the facility was operated as a contract pilot school, operated initially by the Brady Aviation School for the USAAF Gulf Coast Training Center (later Central Flying Training Command).  Later, the contract was taken over by the Dallas Aviation School and Air College.

Several local axillary landing airfields were associated with Curtis Field, the Curtis Ranch; Moore Field; Sneed Field and White Field for emergency and overflow landings.

It is notable that enlisted sergeant pilots received their primary flight training at Curtis Field in early 1942.  This program was ended later in the year.  The last pilot training class ended in February 1945 and military control of the airport ended.

Airline flights (Trans-Texas DC-3s) ended in 1958–59.

See also

 Texas World War II Army Airfields
 32d Flying Training Wing (World War II)

References

External links

 Curtis Field
 

Airports in Texas
Airfields of the United States Army Air Forces in Texas
Buildings and structures in McCulloch County, Texas
USAAF Contract Flying School Airfields
1941 establishments in Texas
Transportation in McCulloch County, Texas
Airports established in 1941
USAAF Central Flying Training Command
American Theater of World War II